The 1998 NCAA Division I-A football season, play of college football in the United States organized by the National Collegiate Athletic Association at the Division I-A level, began in late summer 1998 and culminated with the major bowl games in early January 1999. It was the first season of the Bowl Championship Series (BCS), which saw the Tennessee Volunteers win the national championship, one year after star quarterback Peyton Manning left for the National Football League (NFL). Tennessee defeated the Florida State Seminoles, 23–16, in the Fiesta Bowl in Tempe, Arizona, to secure the inaugural BCS National Championship.

The BCS combined elements of the old Bowl Coalition and the Bowl Alliance it replaced. The agreement existed between the Rose, Fiesta, Sugar, and Orange bowl games, with the Cotton Bowl Classic diminishing in status since the breakup of the Southwest Conference. Like the Bowl Alliance, a national championship game would rotate between the four bowls, with the top two teams facing each other. These teams were chosen based upon a BCS poll, combining the AP Poll, the Coaches Poll, and a computer component. The computer factored in things such as strength of schedule, margin of victory, and quality wins without taking into account time (in other words, a loss early in the season and a loss late in the season were on equal footing). Like the Bowl Coalition, the BCS bowls not hosting the national championship game would retain their traditional conference tie-ins.

The first run of the Bowl Championship Series was not without controversy as Kansas State finished third in the final BCS standings, but was not invited to a BCS bowl game. Ohio State (ranked 4th) and two-loss Florida (8th) received the at-large bids instead.  Also, Tulane went undefeated, but finished 10th in the BCS standings and was not invited to a BCS bowl because of their low strength of schedule.

Rule changes

The following rule changes were adopted by the NCAA Rules Committee during their 1998 meeting:

 Defensive players are allowed to recover and advance backward passes.  Previously the defense was only allowed to recover but not advance backward passes.
 Illegal touching of a forward pass by an ineligible receiver is a five-yard penalty from the previous spot but no loss-of-down.
 Defensive players may not rough an offensive player in position to receive a backward pass (i.e. trail man on option play).
 Standardized uniform recognition regarding memorializing of deceased or severely ill teammates/coaches.
 Eyeshields must be clear.
 The titles of side judge and field judge were swapped, with the field judge now working on the same side of the field as the line judge (and ruling on placements with the back judge), and the side judge on the same side as the head linesman. Coincidentally, the NFL swapped the titles of back judge and field judge to match the NCAA prior to its 1998 season.

Conference and program changes
With no teams upgrading from Division I-AA, the number of Division I-A schools was fixed at 112.

Army broke away from almost one hundred years of tradition as an independent, joining Conference USA.

Regular season top 10 matchups
Rankings reflect the AP Poll. Rankings for Week 8 and beyond will list BCS Rankings first and AP Poll second. Teams that failed to be a top 10 team for one poll or the other will be noted.
Week 3
No. 6 Tennessee defeated No. 2 Florida, 20–17 OT (Neyland Stadium, Knoxville, Tennessee)
Week 4
No. 2 Nebraska defeated No. 9 Washington, 55–7 (Memorial Stadium, Lincoln, Nebraska)
Week 5
 No. 1 Ohio State defeated No. 7 Penn State 28–9, (Ohio Stadium, Columbus, Ohio)
Week 6
 No. 3 UCLA defeated No. 10 Arizona 52–28, (Arizona Stadium, Tucson, Arizona)
 No. 4 Tennessee defeated No. 7 Georgia 22–3, (Sanford Stadium, Athens, Georgia)
Week 11
No. 1/1 Tennessee defeated No. 7/10 Arkansas, 28–24 (Neyland Stadium, Knoxville, Tennessee)
Week 12
No. 4/5 Florida State defeated No. 5/4 Florida, 23–12 (Doak Campbell Stadium, Tallahassee, Florida)
Week 14
No. 8/10 Texas A&M defeated No. 3/2 Kansas State, 36–33 2OT (1998 Big 12 Championship Game, Trans World Dome, St. Louis, Missouri)

Conference standings

Bowl games

Rankings are from the AP Poll.

Final polls

Heisman Trophy voting
The Heisman Memorial Trophy Award is given to the Most Outstanding Player of the year
Winner:
Ricky Williams, Texas, Running Back (2335 points)
2. Michael Bishop, Kansas St. (792 points)
3. Cade McNown, UCLA (696 points)
4. Tim Couch, Kentucky (527 points)
5. Donovan McNabb, Syracuse (232 points)

Other major awards
Maxwell Award (College Player of the Year) - Ricky Williams, Texas
Walter Camp Award (Back) - Ricky Williams, Texas
Davey O'Brien Award (Quarterback) - Michael Bishop, Kansas St.
Johnny Unitas Golden Arm Award (Senior Quarterback) - Cade McNown, UCLA
Doak Walker Award (Running Back) - Ricky Williams, Texas
Fred Biletnikoff Award (Wide Receiver) - Troy Edwards, Louisiana Tech
Bronko Nagurski Trophy (Defensive Player) - Champ Bailey, Georgia
Chuck Bednarik Award - Dat Nguyen, Texas A&M
Dick Butkus Award (Linebacker) - Chris Claiborne, USC
Lombardi Award (Lineman or Linebacker) - Dat Nguyen, Texas A&M
Outland Trophy (Interior Lineman) - Kris Farris, UCLA
Jim Thorpe Award (Defensive Back) - Antoine Winfield, Ohio St.
Lou Groza Award (Placekicker) - Sebastian Janikowski, Florida St.
Paul "Bear" Bryant Award - Bill Snyder, Kansas St.
Football Writers Association of America Coach of the Year Award - Phillip Fulmer, Tennessee

References